Diachenko may refer to:

People
Diachenko or Dyachenko, a surname of Ukrainian origin
Alex M. Diachenko (1919–1943), United States Navy sailor and Silver Star recipient
Olena Diachenko (born 2001), Ukrainian rhythmic gymnast

Other
USS Diachenko (APD-123), a United States Navy high-speed transport in commission from 1944 to 1959 and from 1961 to 1969

See also